YPD may refer to:
An alternate abbreviation for YEPD, a growth medium for yeast
Yamla Pagla Deewana, a 2011 Bollywood movie.